Tebosa is a Portuguese parish, located in the municipality of Braga. The population in 2011 was 1,129, in an area of 2.59 km².

Main sights
Stringed Instruments Museum

References

Freguesias of Braga